Alexej Jaškin (born July 22, 1965) is a Russian-born Czech former professional ice hockey defenceman. He won six Czech Extraliga championships. He is the father of ice hockey player Dmitrij Jaškin, who currently plays in the NHL for the Arizona Coyotes.

Career statistics

References

External links
 

1965 births
Living people
Czech ice hockey defencemen
Naturalized citizens of the Czech Republic
Russian emigrants to the Czech Republic
Sportspeople from Krasnoyarsk
HC Sibir Novosibirsk players
HC Khimik Voskresensk players
VHK Vsetín players
Sokol Krasnoyarsk players
Soviet ice hockey defencemen
Russian ice hockey defencemen
Russian expatriate sportspeople in the Czech Republic
Czech expatriate sportspeople in Slovakia
Czech ice hockey coaches
Russian expatriate sportspeople in Slovakia
Russian ice hockey coaches